Xinlin is a subdivision of Daxing'anling Prefecture, in the far north of Heilongjiang province, China.

Administrative divisions 
Xinlin District is divided into 7 towns. 
7 towns

Climate

See also

Notes and references 

Xinlin